This is a list of mountains in the Golan Heights.

Pictures

References

Golan
Mountains of Israeli-occupied territories
Mountains of the Golan Heights